is a Japanese anime production company and former studio, established on May 31, 2002, by former Pierrot staff. The studio made its first animated television series, Magical Girl Lyrical Nanoha, in 2004. Since then, the company has produced a number of other animated television series and movies.

In 2012, the animation section was split off by forming {{nihongo|Seven Arcs Pictures Co., Ltd.|株式会社Seven Arcs Pictures|Kabushiki-gaisha Sebun Ākusu Pikuchāzu|lead=yes}} as a subsidiary company. Since then, Seven Arcs has had its business in animation planning and licence management. On December 26, 2017, the company was acquired by Tokyo Broadcasting System. Seven Arcs Pictures, Seven Arcs, and Arcturus merged on October 1, 2019, reforming as the single company Seven Arcs.

Productions

Seven Arcs (2002–2012)

Television series
Magical Girl Lyrical Nanoha (2004)
Magical Girl Lyrical Nanoha A's (2005)
Inukami! (2006)
Magical Girl Lyrical Nanoha StrikerS (2007)
Sekirei (2008)
White Album (2009)
Asura Cryin' (2009)
Asura Cryin' 2 (2009)
Sekirei ~Pure Engagement~ (2010)
Dog Days (2011)
Dog Days' (2012)

OVA
Triangle Heart: Sweet Songs Forever (2003)
Sekirei (2008)
Sekirei ~Pure Engagement~ (2010)

Films
Inukami! The Movie: Tokumei Reiteki Sōsakan Karina Shirō! (2007)
Magical Girl Lyrical Nanoha The MOVIE 1st (2010)
Magical Girl Lyrical Nanoha The MOVIE 2nd A's (2012)

Seven Arcs Pictures (2012–2019)

Television series
Mushibugyo (2013)
Trinity Seven (2014)
Dog Days" (2015)
Ooya-san wa Shishunki! (2016)
Idol Memories (2016)
ViVid Strike! (2016)
Basilisk: The Ōka Ninja Scrolls (2018)
Dances with the Dragons (2018)
Bermuda Triangle: Colorful Pastrale (2019)

OVA/ONA
Mushibugyo (2014–2015)
Trinity Seven (2015)
Majestic Prince: Wings to the Future (2016, co-production with Orange)

Films
Yakusoku no Utsuwa: Arita no Hatsukoi (2016)
Fuyu no Chikai, Natsu no Matsuri: Takeoshi no Dai-Kusunoki (2016)
Galactic Armored Fleet Majestic Prince: Genetic Awakening (2016, co-production with Orange)
Trinity Seven the Movie: The Eternal Library and the Alchemist Girl (2017)
Magical Girl Lyrical Nanoha Reflection (2017)
Magical Girl Lyrical Nanoha Detonation (2018)
Trinity Seven: Heavens Library & Crimson Lord (2019)

Canceled works
New Life+: Young Again in Another World - Originally planned for an October 2018 premiere. However, it was later cancelled on account of controversial remarks by the light novel's author MINE

Seven Arcs (merged company, 2019–present)

Television series
Arte (2020)
Fly Me to the Moon (2020–present)
Blue Period (2021)
Extreme Hearts (2022)
Chained Soldier (2023)

OVA/ONA
Fly Me to the Moon ~SNS~ (2021)

References

External links
Official website 

 
Japanese animation studios
Mass media companies established in 2002
Japanese companies established in 2002
Nakano, Tokyo
Animation studios in Tokyo
Tokyo Broadcasting System
2017 mergers and acquisitions